Wetlesen is surname. Notable people with the surname include:

Minna Wetlesen (1821–1891), Norwegian educator, teacher, and author
Wilhelm Wetlesen (1871–1925), Norwegian painter and illustrator

Norwegian-language surnames